The 2012 FA Women's Cup Final was the 42nd final of the FA Women's Cup. 276 clubs competed for the years trophy. The winners did not qualify for the UEFA Women's Champions League.

Birmingham City Ladies, beat Chelsea Ladies 3–2 in a penalty shoot-out after a 2–2 draw in the final at Ashton Gate.

The match was televised live by Sky Sports 2. The channel's decision to switch the transmission of the penalty shoot-out to behind the red button was criticised and described as embarrassing. The attendance of 8,723 was the lowest at the FA Women's Cup final since 2005. Entertainment at the final included a half time performance from The Risk, a boy band who had finished 10th in the previous year's edition of The X Factor.

Route to the final

Birmingham City Ladies

As an FA WSL team, Birmingham City Ladies entered the competition in the fifth round, where they were drawn at home to Liverpool Ladies. They were rewarded for their first half performance on 26 minutes, when Jodie Taylor struck to put them a goal up. It was 2-0 just moments later after the half-time though, when Liverpool's goalie Aroon Clansey rushed from her line to deny Carney, only to see her header fall to Isobel Christiansen, who showed terrific instincts to volley into the unguarded net from around 35 yards out. With seconds left, the home side did increase their lead when a Chelsea Weston pass found its way to substitute Maz Ballard, who touched the ball past Clansey before poking the ball into the empty net from close range, to give Birmingham a 3-0 win.

Birmingham faced Sunderland Women in the sixth round at Stratford Town. Kerys Harrop scored in the 22nd minute to give Birmingham the lead. Taylor very nearly bagged a second moments later – only for her goal-bound attempt to be saved by Sunderland 'keeper Rachael Laws. The hosts were able to coast through the remainder of the first-half, but still had the appetite for a third goal courtesy of Harrop. With Blues fully in control, Eniola Aluko added a fourth after 83 minutes, to give Birmingham a 4-0 victory.

Bristol Academy Women were the opponents in the semi-final, held at Tamworth. Birmingham made the best possible start at Tamworth FC – taking the lead through Rachel William's header on nine minutes. An eventful start produced more drama shortly afterwards the opener, when Carney's goal-bound corner was handled on the line by Bristol Academy's Alex Culvin, leaving the referee no option but to brandish a red card. The Vixens were lucky not to receive further punishment, however, due to Williams hacking the resulting penalty wide. With David Parker's side firmly in the ascendancy, there was little action to speak of in the remainder of the first-half, that was until Carney bagged two quick fire braces shortly before the break. Williams' second was equally as emphatic – smashing home Jodie Taylor's looping cross. Mark Sampson's team grabbed a consolation courtesy of Laura del Río's strike late on, but this couldn’t take the gloss off a memorable day for the Ladies, but Birmingham secure their place in the final for the first time in the FA Women's Cup history.

Chelsea Ladies

Chelsea Ladies – also a FA WSL team – entered the competition in the fifth round too. Their opening match was a 3–0 home win against Brighton & Hove Albion Women & Girls. After a goalless first half Dunia Susi struck early in the second, before Helen Bleazard and Sue Lappin scored to give Chelsea a 3–0 win.

Chelsea were drawn to play at away against Doncaster Rovers Belles in the sixth round. From Sophie Ingle's corner kick, her high delivery was met at the far post by Gemma Bonner, who prodded home from a yard out to give Chelsea the advantage. From Danielle Buet's delivery, Bonner flicked onto Susi, who was not to be denied, meeting the ball with a powerful header into the top corner to secure Chelsea's place in the final four with a 2-0 win.

Chelsea faced Arsenal Ladies in the semi-final at Brentford. Chelsea took the lead in stunning fashion midway through the first half. Winning the ball on the halfway line, winger Bleazard drove in from the left, before unleashing a superb 25-yard drive into the top corner to give the Blues the advantage. Stand-in skipper Susi almost doubled the Blues' advantage after racing clear to meet Dani Buet's through-ball, forcing Emma Byrne into a low save, and Chelsea also secure their place in the final for the first time in the FA Women's Cup history.

Pre-match
The event represented a first final appearance for either club, as well as the first time the match had been held in Bristol.

Match

Summary
Helen Lander put Chelsea ahead in the 70th minute courtesy of a neat turn and finish and it looked for a long time that this solitary goal would be enough for glory, but Rachel Williams equalised in the 91st minute after Chelsea failed to clear a Karen Carney corner. The Londoners retook the lead in the first half of extra time through substitute Kate Longhurst, but the Blues bounced back once more when Carney converted a centrally-placed free-kick on the edge of the box. This goal forced the penalty shoot-out which they would eventually triumph in. Williams saw her kick saved by Carly Telford but Rachel Unitt, Jodie Taylor and Karen Carney all converted for the Midlanders. Chelsea's Drew Spence saw her penalty saved by Rebecca Spencer, Claire Rafferty hooked her penalty wide and Gemma Bonner blazed hers over the bar to hand The Cup to Birmingham.

Details

See also
2011–12 FA Women's Cup

References

FA
Women's FA Cup finals
FA Women's Cup Final, 2012
FA WSL Cup Final 2012